Saint-Maurice is the name or part of the name of places. It refers to the legendary Saint Maurice.

Canada 
Saint-Maurice (Lower Canada), an electoral district 1792–1838
Saint-Maurice (Province of Canada), an electoral district 1841–1867
Saint-Maurice (electoral district), a former federal electoral district represented in the House of Commons, in Quebec 1867–1896, 1968–2004
Saint-Maurice River in Quebec
Saint-Maurice (provincial electoral district), in Quebec 1867–2018
Saint-Maurice, Quebec, a parish municipality in the Mauricie region of the province of Quebec
Saint-Maurice, a community within the City of La Tuque, Quebec
Saint-Maurice, a community within Wellington Parish, New Brunswick
Saint-Maurice-de-Dalquier, a community within the City of Amos, Quebec
Saint-Maurice-de-l'Échouerie, a community within the City of Gaspé, Quebec

France 
 Bourg-Saint-Maurice, Savoie
 Saint-Maurice, Haute-Marne
 Saint-Maurice, Nièvre
 Saint-Maurice, Puy-de-Dôme
 Saint-Maurice, Bas-Rhin
 Saint-Maurice, Val-de-Marne
 Saint-Maurice-aux-Forges, in the Meurthe-et-Moselle department
 Saint-Maurice-aux-Riches-Hommes, in the Yonne department
 Saint-Maurice-Colombier, in the Doubs department
 Saint-Maurice-Crillat, in the Jura department
 Saint-Maurice-d'Ardèche, in the Ardèche department
 Saint-Maurice-d'Ételan, in the Seine-Maritime department
 Saint-Maurice-d'Ibie, in the Ardèche department
 Saint-Maurice-de-Beynost, in the Ain department
 Saint-Maurice-de-Cazevieille, in the Gard department
 Saint-Maurice-de-Gourdans, in the Ain department
 Saint-Maurice-de-Lestapel, in the Lot-et-Garonne department
 Saint-Maurice-de-Lignon, in the Haute-Loire department
 Saint-Maurice-de-Rémens, in the Ain department
 Saint-Maurice-de-Rotherens, in the Savoie department
 Saint-Maurice-de-Satonnay, in the Saône-et-Loire department
 Saint-Maurice-de-Tavernole, in the Charente-Maritime department
 Saint-Maurice-de-Ventalon, in the Lozère department
 Saint-Maurice-des-Champs, in the Saône-et-Loire department
 Saint-Maurice-des-Lions, in the Charente department
 Saint-Maurice-des-Noues, in the Vendée department
 Saint-Maurice-du-Désert, in the Orne department
 Saint-Maurice-en-Chalencon, in the Ardèche department
 Saint-Maurice-en-Cotentin, in the Manche department
 Saint-Maurice-en-Gourgois, in the Loire department
 Saint-Maurice-en-Quercy, in the Lot department
 Saint-Maurice-en-Rivière, in the Saône-et-Loire department
 Saint-Maurice-en-Trièves, in the Isère department
 Saint-Maurice-en-Valgodemard, in the Hautes-Alpes department
 Saint-Maurice-la-Clouère, in the Vienne department
 Saint-Maurice-l'Exil, in the Isère department
 Saint-Maurice-la-Fougereuse, in the Deux-Sèvres department
 Saint-Maurice-la-Souterraine, in the Creuse department
 Saint-Maurice-le-Girard, in the Vendée department
 Saint-Maurice-le-Vieil, in the Yonne department
 Saint-Maurice-les-Brousses, in the Haute-Vienne department
 Saint-Maurice-lès-Charencey, in the Orne department
 Saint-Maurice-lès-Châteauneuf, in the Saône-et-Loire department
 Saint-Maurice-lès-Couches, in the Saône-et-Loire department
 Saint-Maurice-Montcouronne, in the Essonne department
 Saint-Maurice-Navacelles, in the Hérault department
 Saint-Maurice-près-Crocq, in the Creuse department
 Saint-Maurice-près-Pionsat, in the Puy-de-Dôme department
 Saint-Maurice-Saint-Germain, in the Eure-et-Loir department
 Saint-Maurice-sous-les-Côtes, in the Meuse department
 Saint-Maurice-sur-Adour, in the Landes department
 Saint-Maurice-sur-Aveyron, in the Loiret department
 Saint-Maurice-sur-Dargoire, in the Rhône department
 Saint-Maurice-sur-Eygues, in the Drôme department
 Saint-Maurice-sur-Fessard, in the Loiret department
 Saint-Maurice-sur-Huisne, in the Orne department
 Saint-Maurice-sur-Mortagne, in the Vosges department
 Saint-Maurice-sur-Moselle, in the Vosges department
 Saint-Maurice-sur-Vingeanne, in the Côte-d'Or department
 Saint-Maurice-Thizouaille, in the Yonne department

Switzerland 
Saint-Maurice, Switzerland (Roman Agaunum) is a municipality and a district in the Valais
St. Maurice's Abbey
Saint-Maurice, Collonge-Bellerive, a locality in the municipality Collonge-Bellerive

United States
 Saint Maurice, Indiana, a town
 Saint Maurice, Louisiana, an unincorporated community

See also 
 St. Moritz (disambiguation)